The 8th Parliament of the Province of Canada was summoned in August 1863, following the general election for the Legislative Assembly in August 1863. The Parliament was abolished when the British North America Act, 1867 (now the Constitution Act, 1867) came into force on July 1, 1867, creating the new country of Canada.

The first session of this Parliament sat from 13 August 1863 to 15 October 1863. Sessions were held in Quebec City until the fourth session 8 August 1865 to 18 September 1865. The fifth and last session was held in Ottawa in the newly completed Parliament building 8 June 1866 to 15 August 1866.

The Speakerof the Legislative Assembly was Lewis Wallbridge.

This was also the last session of the Legislative Assembly of the Province of Canada. Following Confederation in the following year, it was succeeded by 1st Legislative Assembly of Ontario in Toronto, the 1st Quebec Legislature, and the 1st Canadian Parliament in Ottawa.

Most members went on to become elected in the Canadian House of Commons, while other served at provincial level, appointed to the Senate of Canada, provincial Lieutenant Governor, government posts or simply retired from politics altogether.

Canada East - 65 Seats

Canada West - 65 Seats

References 

Upper Canadian politics in the 1850s, Underhill (and others), University of Toronto Press (1967)

External links 
 Ontario's parliament buildings ; or, A century of legislation, 1792-1892 : a historical sketch
  Assemblée nationale du Québec (French)

08